HMHS Rewa (His Majesty's Hospital ship) was a steamship originally built for the British-India Steam Navigation Company for their mail and passenger service but requisitioned in August 1914 and fitted out for use as a British hospital ship during the First World War. On 4 January 1918, she was hit and sunk by a torpedo from the German U-boat .

History
Rewa was ordered in 1905 by the British India Steam Navigation Company (BI) from William Denny & Bros at Dumbarton at the same time as sister ship SS Rohilla from Harland & Wolff Ltd of Belfast. They differed mainly in their engines: Rewa was triple-screw with steam turbines, while Rohilla had a pair of quadruple expansion steam engines, also made by Harland & Wolff, and twin screws. Rohillas engines totalled , producing  on sea trials. Although ordered for the London to Calcutta service, increased competition prompted BI to design the two sisters to be suitable also as troopships.

Career

The British India Company's transport Rewa was run aground at the Suez Canal on 26 November 1906, blocking the canal, and was refloated by the next day. In 1913 she entered the Suez Canal from Karachi carrying the 2nd Battalion, Worcestershire Regiment homeward bound to England.

Sinking

On 4 January 1918, Rewa was returning to Britain from Malta with 279 wounded officers aboard. Neutral inspectors from Spain had boarded the ship in Gibraltar to confirm that she had no military function. The ship took around two hours to sink, allowing all wounded and ship's crew to board lifeboats except for the four engine men who died in the initial explosion.

Aftermath
The sinking of the ship caused outrage in Britain. The German high command denied sinking the ship, instead blaming the explosion on a loose British mine. However, German naval command had declared unrestricted submarine warfare in a desperate effort to win the war. The naval command secretly ordered U-boat captains to sink any Allied ship, including hospital ships, even though it violated Hague Convention X. However, the captain of U-55 Wilhelm Werner—perhaps fearing the consequences of his actions—wrote in the ship's log that he sank a cargo vessel and not a brightly lit and painted hospital ship. After the war, Wilhelm Werner was charged with war crimes but fled to Brazil. In 2002, a stone was erected near Hartland Point dedicated to the ship and the people who served and died on her.

Wreckage
The wreckage lies at 50.55°N 04.49°W, which is located off the west UK coast. During the Second World War, the wreckage was often mistaken by British sonar for a German U-boat. To confirm that a U-boat was not just hiding on the sea bed, Allied ships would drop depth charges, called opening the "tin can". If oil or German bodies floated to the surface then they knew they had destroyed a U-boat. If nothing floated up then they would move to the next sonar target. This process totally destroyed the wreck of Rewa.

See also
List of United Kingdom disasters by death toll

References

External links
 

World War I shipwrecks in the Atlantic Ocean
Ships built on the River Clyde
Maritime incidents in 1918
Hospital ships in World War I
Ships sunk by German submarines in World War I
1906 ships
Ships of the British India Steam Navigation Company
Hospital ships of the Royal Navy
Cornish shipwrecks